You Could Look It Up is a 2016 book of essays on the history of reference works by Jack Lynch.

You Could Look It Up may also refer to:
 "You Could Look it Up", 1941 magazine short story by James Thurber
 "You could/can look it up", mid-20th-century catchphrases of baseball manager Casey Stengel 
 You Could Look it Up, 1979 biography of baseball figure Casey Stengel by Maury Allen
 "You Could Look it Up", 2000s column by Steven Goldman on Baseball Prospectus